Scott Cinema (originally the Odeon Cinema) is a cinema in Bridgwater, Somerset England. Built in 1936, it is notable for its Art Deco style.

History

The Odeon
The cinema opened as one of the chain of Odeon Cinemas. It was designed by Thomas Cecil Howitt, who designed other cinemas of the Odeon chain including the  Odeon Cinema, Weston-super-Mare. The film The Amateur Gentleman was shown on the opening night, 13 July 1936.

The auditorium seated 1,525, of which 931 were in the stalls and 594 in a raised balcony that did not overhang the stalls. There were stage facilities, used by local drama companies. Externally, the corner entrance was below a tower, and to its left the building included a row of shops with flats above.

The Classic, and later
It was renamed the Classic in 1967, after its sale to the Classic Cinema chain. In 1973 there was a conversion into a bingo club in the stalls section, and two cinemas, each seating 250, in the raised balcony section.

It closed as a Classic Cinema in 1983, and later opened as an independent company. It is now one of the Scott Cinemas chain, being renamed Scott Cinema about 2005. There was refurbishment in 2005, 2011 and 2013.

References

Bridgwater
1936 establishments in England
Cinemas in Somerset
Art Deco architecture in England